Río Chico Department is a department in Tucumán Province, Argentina. It has a population of 52,925 (2001) and an area of 585 km². The seat of the department is in Aguilares.

Municipalities and communes
Aguilares
El Polear
Los Sarmientos y La Tipa
Monte Bello
Santa Ana

Notes
This article includes content from the Spanish Wikipedia article Departamento Río Chico (Tucumán).

Departments of Tucumán Province